In Greek mythology, Lethe (Ancient Greek:  Lḗthē;), also referred to as Lemosyne, was one of the five rivers of the underworld of Hades. Also known as the Ameles potamos (river of unmindfulness), the Lethe flowed around the cave of Hypnos and through the Underworld where all those who drank from it experienced complete forgetfulness. Lethe was also the name of the Greek spirit of forgetfulness and oblivion, with whom the river was often identified.

In Classical Greek, the word lethe (λήθη) literally means "oblivion", "forgetfulness", or "concealment".  It is related to the Greek word for "truth", aletheia (ἀλήθεια), which through the privative alpha literally means "un-forgetfulness" or "un-concealment".

Infernal river
Lethe, the river of forgetfulness, is one of the five rivers of the Greek underworld; the other four are Acheron (the river of sorrow), Cocytus (the river of lamentation), Phlegethon (the river of fire)  and Styx (the river that separates Earth and the Underworld). According to Statius, Lethe bordered Elysium, the final resting place of the virtuous. Ovid wrote that the river flowed through the cave of Hypnos, god of sleep, where its murmuring would induce drowsiness.

The shades of the dead were required to drink the waters of the Lethe in order to forget their earthly life.  In the Aeneid (VI.703-751), Virgil writes that it is only when the dead have had their memories erased by the Lethe that they may be reincarnated.

The river Lethe was said to be located next to Hades' palace in the underworld under a cypress tree. Orpheus would give some shades (the Greek term for ghosts or spirits) a password to tell Hades' servants which would allow them to drink instead from the Mnemosyne (the pool of memory), which was located under a poplar tree. An Orphic inscription, said to be dated from between the second and third century B.C. warns readers to avoid the Lethe and to seek the Mnemosyne instead. Drinkers of the Lethe's water would not be quenched of their thirst, often causing them to drink more than necessary.

Goddess
Lethe was also the name of the personification of forgetfulness and oblivion, with whom the river was often associated. Although some sources have identified Lethe as the daughter of Oceanus, the father of other river goddesses, Hesiod's Theogony identifies her as the daughter of Eris (Strife):

Lethe is often compared to Mnemosyne, the goddess of memory. Roger Brooke describes their dynamic in his 1999 book Pathways into the Jungian World: Phenomenology and Analytical Psychology stating "Rather than only constituting disaster and darkness, Lethe also presents their obliteration – something like the withdrawal of life...".

Role in religion and philosophy
Some ancient Greeks believed that souls were made to drink from the river before being reincarnated, so that they would not remember their past lives. The Myth of Er in Book X of Plato's Republic tells of the dead arriving at a barren waste called the "plain of Lethe", through which the river Ameles ("careless") runs. "Of this they were all obliged to drink a certain quantity," Plato wrote, "and those who were not saved by wisdom drank more than was necessary; and each one as he drank forgot all things." A few mystery religions taught the existence of another river, the Mnemosyne; those who drank from the Mnemosyne would remember everything and attain omniscience. Initiates were taught that they would receive a choice of rivers to drink from after death, and to drink from Mnemosyne instead of Lethe.

These two rivers are attested in several verse inscriptions on gold plates dating to the 4th century BC and onward, found at Thurii in Southern Italy and elsewhere throughout the Greek world. There were rivers of Lethe and Mnemosyne at the oracular shrine of Trophonius in Boeotia, from which worshippers would drink before making oracular consultations with the god.

More recently, Martin Heidegger used "lēthē" to symbolize not only the "concealment of Being" or "forgetting of Being", but also the "concealment of concealment", which he saw as a major problem of modern philosophy. Examples are found in his books on Nietzsche (Vol 1, p. 194) and on Parmenides. Philosophers since, such as William J. Richardson have expanded on this school of thought.

The goddess Lethe has been compared to the goddess Meng Po of Chinese Mythology, who would wait on the Bridge of Forgetfulness to serve dead souls soup which would erase their memories before they were reincarnated.

Real rivers 

Amongst authors in antiquity, the tiny Lima river between Norte Region, Portugal, and Galicia, Spain, was said to have the same properties of memory loss as the legendary Lethe River, being mistaken for it. In 138 BCE, the Roman general Decimus Junius Brutus Callaicus sought to dispose of the myth, as it impeded his military campaigns in the area. He was said to have personally crossed the Lima, and then called his soldiers from the other side, one by one, by name. The soldiers, astonished that their general remembered their names, crossed the river as well without fear. This act proved that the Lima was not as dangerous as the local myths described.

In Cádiz, Spain, the river Guadalete was originally named "Lethe" by local Greek and Phoenician colonists who, about to go to war, solved instead their differences by diplomacy and named the river Lethe to forever forget their former differences. When the Arabs conquered the region much later, their name for the river became Guadalete from the Arabic phrase  وادي لكة (Wadi lakath) meaning "River of Forgetfulness".

In Alaska, a river which runs through the Valley of Ten Thousand Smokes is called the River Lethe. It is located within the Katmai National Park and Preserve in southwest Alaska.

References in literature 

Simonides of Ceos, an ancient Greek lyrical poet, references Lethe in the sixty-seventh fragment of one of his poems.
In 29 BCE, Virgil wrote about Lethe in his didactic hexameter poem, the Georgics. Lethe is also referenced in Virgil's epic Latin poem, Aeneid, when the title protagonist travels to Lethe to meet the ghost of his father in Book VI of the poem.

 Ovid includes a description of Lethe as a stream that puts people to sleep in his work Metamorphoses (8 AD)
In the Purgatorio, the second cantica of Dante Alighieri's Divine Comedy, the Lethe is located in the Earthly Paradise atop the Mountain of Purgatory. The piece, written in the early 14th century, tells of Dante's immersion in the Lethe so that his memories are wiped of sin (Purg. XXXI). The Lethe is also mentioned in the Inferno, the first part of the Comedy, as flowing down to Hell from Purgatory to be frozen in the ice around Satan, "the last lost vestiges of the sins of the saved" (Inf. XXXIV.130).
William Shakespeare references Lethe's identity as the "river of forgetfulness" in a speech of the Ghost in Act 1 Scene 5 of Hamlet: "and duller should thoust be than the fat weed / That roots itself in ease on Lethe wharf," written sometime between 1599 and 1601.
In John Milton's Paradise Lost, written in 1667, his first speech in Satan describes how "The associates and copartners of our loss, Lie thus astonished on the oblivious pool", referencing Lethe.
The English poet John Keats references the river in poems "Ode to a Nightingale" and "Ode on Melancholy" written in 1819.  
 The French poet Charles Baudelaire referred to the river in his poem "Spleen", published posthumously in 1869. The final line is "Où coule au lieu de sang l'eau verte du Léthé" which one translator renders as "... in whose veins flows the green water of Lethe ..." (the reference offers a few more English translations). Baudelaire also wrote a poem called "Lethe".
 Allen Ginsberg refers to the river in the final line of his poem "A Supermarket in California".
Throughout Stephen Baxter's Xeelee Sequence, 'Lethe' is used as an exclamation from the early 21st century onwards.
 Thomas Mann in his short story "A Man And His Dog" has the pointer Bashan's owner express the sentiment: "It is good to walk like this in the early morning, with senses rejuvenated and spirit cleansed by the night's long healing draught of Lethe".
Lethe is a memory-erasing tool in Sugaru Miaki's (三秋縋) science-fiction novel Your Story (君の話).

References in visual art 

 In 1880 John Roddam Spencer Stanhope painted The Waters of the Lethe by the Plains of Elysium, depicting pilgrims traveling to the Lethe River.
 Romaine Brooks' 1930 sketch entitled Lethe depicts genderless figures surrounding a woman dipping her foot into the river of forgetfulness.
 Cyrus Dallin's plaster sculpture Le Lethe, 1903, depicts the goddess Lethe asleep upon a bed of poppies and a truncated tree.

See also
 The Golden Bough (mythology)
 Meng Po

Notes

References 

 Caldwell, Richard, Hesiod's Theogony, Focus Publishing/R. Pullins Company (June 1, 1987). .
 Gaius Julius Hyginus, Fabulae from The Myths of Hyginus translated and edited by Mary Grant. University of Kansas Publications in Humanistic Studies. Online version at the Topos Text Project.
 Hesiod, Theogony from The Homeric Hymns and Homerica with an English Translation by Hugh G. Evelyn-White, Cambridge, MA.,Harvard University Press; London, William Heinemann Ltd. 1914. Online version at the Perseus Digital Library. Greek text available from the same website.
 Publius Papinius Statius, The Achilleid translated by Mozley, J H. Loeb Classical Library Volumes. Cambridge, MA, Harvard University Press; London, William Heinemann Ltd. 1928. Online version at the theoi.com
 Publius Papinius Statius, The Achilleid. Vol. II. John Henry Mozley. London: William Heinemann; New York: G.P. Putnam's Sons. 1928. Latin text available at the Perseus Digital Library.
 Strabo, The Geography of Strabo. Edition by H.L. Jones. Cambridge, Mass.: Harvard University Press; London: William Heinemann, Ltd. 1924. Online version at the Perseus Digital Library.
 Strabo, Geographica edited by A. Meineke. Leipzig: Teubner. 1877. Greek text available at the Perseus Digital Library.

Rivers of Hades
Underworld goddesses
Greek goddesses
Personifications in Greek mythology
Children of Eris (mythology)